Eagle was a freighter that was sunk intentionally near Lower Matecumbe Key, Florida, to become an artificial reef and diving spot.

Ship history
The ship was built in 1962 for Danish shipowners J. Lauritzen A/S at Bijkers Shipyard, Gorinchem, Netherlands, and named Raila Dan. In 1969, she was sold to the Dutch shipping company Poseidon and renamed Barok. In 1974, she was sold again, and renamed Carmela. She was then sold and renamed Ytai in 1976, and yet again sold, and renamed Etai the following year. In 1981, she was sold and renamed Carigulf Pioneer, and sold for the final time in 1984 and renamed Arron K. On 6 October 1985, the Arron K. caught fire while sailing from Miami to Venezuela, and was damaged beyond economical repair. On 19 December 1985, the ship was bought by the Florida Keys Artificial Reef Association, renamed Eagle Tire Co. and sunk as an artificial reef near Lower Matecumbe Key, Florida.

Wreck

References

External links
 
 
 
 

1962 ships
Shipwrecks of the Florida Keys
Maritime incidents in 1985
Ships sunk as artificial reefs